Davide Ferrari (born 20 February 1992) is an Italian footballer who plays as a defender or midfielder. He appeared in the third tier of football in Italy for San Marino and Viareggio.

Career
A youth product of Brescia Calcio, Ferrari was a player of the youth reserve team during the 2008–09 season. In 2010 Ferrari was signed by 
Rodengo–Saiano in co-ownership deal for a peppercorn fee of €250. Ferrari remained as a player for the reserve team. In January 2011 Brescia bought back Ferrari for a peppercorn of €500. He was signed by Calcio Como in another co-ownership deal ca 2011. On 31 August 2011 Ferrari was bought back by Brescia. Emanuele Bardelloni also moved to Como in co-ownership as part of the deal. Ferrari was a player for the reserve team of Brescia in 2011–12 season. In mid-2012 Ferrari was signed by San Marino Calcio in another co-ownership deal, for €500. On 21 June 2013 Brescia bought back Ferrari for €1,000. On 1 August 2013 Viareggio signed Ferrari, Nicola Falasco and Gianmarco Gerevini in temporary deals.

References

External links
 AIC profile (data by football.it) 

Italian footballers
Brescia Calcio players
A.C. Rodengo Saiano players
Como 1907 players
A.S.D. Victor San Marino players
F.C. Esperia Viareggio players
Association football defenders
Serie C players
1992 births
Living people